The 2019–20 Hong Kong Premier League (also known as the BOC Life Hong Kong Premier League for sponsorship reasons) was the sixth season of the Hong Kong Premier League, the top division of Hong Kong football.

Kitchee became the champions for the fourth time. Igor Sartori and Serges Déblé were the joint top goalscorers with 6 goals. Tai Po and Yuen Long self-relegated to the Hong Kong First Division.

Effects of the 2019–20 coronavirus pandemic 
Due to the 2020 coronavirus pandemic in Hong Kong, the HKFA announced on 16 April 2020 that all the HKPL matches after 18 March 2020 will be postponed and the 2019–20 season will be resumed not earlier than mid-August, with an aim to finish by early November this year. No relegation will occur this year.

On 30 April 2020, HKFA announced Rangers, Yuen Long and Pegasus announced their withdrawal from the remaining matches this season. Their eligibility for the HKPL next season will remain secure, and the league standing will be adjusted according to the Article D.8 of Competition Regulations: “If any Participating Club ceases to participate in the Competition during the course of the season, the record of the matches of the Competition in which its playing team has participated shall be expunged from the league table”.

On 29 May 2020, Tai Po announced that they, too, would drop out from the restart of the season. This means that there were only 6 teams left in the remaining of the season.

On 17 September 2020, HKFA announced that the season will resume on 19 September 2020 and end on 11 October 2020.

Teams 
A total of 10 teams contest the league, including eight sides from the 2018–19 Hong Kong Premier League and two promoted from the 2018–19 Hong Kong First Division, replacing relegated Dreams FC and Hoi King. On 11 July 2019, Dreams FC decided to self-relegate to the Hong Kong First Division due to lack of funds.  The Hong Kong Football Association held an emergency board meeting on the 15th, during which the board voted to allow Dreams FC to relegate into the First Division and invite Rangers into the HKPL.

Pink denotes a newly promoted club entering the league this year.

Stadia and locations 

Primary venues used in the Hong Kong Premier League:

Personnel and kits

Managerial changes

Foreign players 
The number of foreign players is restricted to seven (including one Asian player and one Chinese player) per team, with no more than four on pitch during matches.

League table

Head to head

Positions by round 
To preserve chronological evolvements, any postponed matches are not included to the round at which they were originally scheduled, but added to the full round they were played immediately afterwards. For example, if a match is scheduled for round 7, but then played between rounds 8 and 9, it will be added to the standings for round 8.

Fixtures and results

Round 1

Round 2

Round 3

Round 4

Round 5

Round 6

Round 7

Round 8

Round 9

Round 10

Resume Round 1 (Origin Round 13)

Resume Round 2 (Origin Round 11 & 14)

Resume Round 3 (Origin Round 15)

Resume Round 4 (Origin Round 16 & 17)

Resume Round 5 (Origin Round 12 & 18)

Notes

Season statistics

Top scorers

Hat-tricks 
Note: The results column shows the scorer's team score first. Teams in bold are home teams.

Note
4 The player scored 4 goals.

Clean sheets

Attendances

Awards

Monthly Most Valuable Player

Hong Kong Top Footballer Awards 
This year's Hong Kong Top Footballer Awards was cancelled due to the 2020 coronavirus pandemic in Hong Kong.

References 

Hong Kong Premier League seasons
Hong Kong
2019–20 in Hong Kong football
Hong Kong Premier League